Ichneumon sarcitorius is a species of wasp belonging to the family Ichneumonidae subfamily Ichneumoninae.

Subspecies
Subspecies within this species include:
 Ichneumon sarcitorius albosignatus Torka, 1930
 Ichneumon sarcitorius caucasicus Meyer, 1926 
 Ichneumon sarcitorius chosensis Uchida, 1927
 Ichneumon sarcitorius corsus Kriechbaumer, 1888
 Ichneumon sarcitorius repetitor Kriechbaumer, 1882
 Ichneumon sarcitorius turkestanicus (Heinrich, 1929)

Description

These wasps show an evident sexual dimorphism. The males have a wasp like appearance with a black and yellow banded abdomen, while the females have a black abdomen with two orange bands and a white tip.

Biology
Adults can be found from July to October. Larvae feed on caterpillars of Erebidae (Lymantria dispar), Noctuidae (Agrotis segetum), Arctiidae (Spilosoma lubricipeda) and Notodontidae , while adults mainly feed on nectar of umbellifers (Heracleum sphondylium).

Distribution
This species is present in most of Europe, in the Near East, in the Oriental realm, and in North Africa.

Bibliography
 Constantineanu, M.I.; Suciu, I.; Andriescu, I.; Ciochia, V.; Pisica, C. (1957) [Contributions a la connaissance des Ichneumonides en R.P.Roumaine. Sousfamille Ichneumoninae Forster arondissement de Husi region de Iassy.] (in Romanian with Russian & French summaries)., Analele Stiintifice ale Universitatii "Al. I. Cuza" din Iasi. Sect. II a. 3:234-263.
 Berthoumieu, V. (1895) Ichneumonides d'Europe et des pays limitrophes., Annales de la Societe Entomologique de France. 63(1894):593-664.
 Zetterstedt, J.W. (1838) Insecta Lapponica. Sectio secunda. Hymenoptera., Lipsiae. 358-408.
 Gmelin, J.F. (1790) Caroli a Linne Systema Naturae (Ed. XIII). Tom I., G.E. Beer. Lipsiae. 2225-3020. (Ichneumon: 2674-2722).
 Fourcroy, A.F. (1785) Entomologia Parisiensis, sive catalogus insectorum quae in agro Parisiensi reperiuntur., Paris. 544 pp.
 Muller, O.F. (1776) Zoologiae Danicae prodromus, seu animalium Daniae et Norvegiae indigenarum characteres, nomina et synomyma imprimis popularium., Hafniae. 282 pp. (Ichneumon on pp. 151–160)
 Linnaeus, C. von (1758) Systema naturae per regna tria naturae, secundum classes, ordines, genera, species cum characteribus, differentiis, synonymis locis. Tomus I. Editio decima, reformata., Laurnetii Salvii, Holmiae. 824 pp. (A photographic facsimile by British Museum (Natural History), London. 1956.)

References

External links
 Ichneumon sarcitorius - Biodiversity Heritage Library - Bibliography
 Ichneumon sarcitorius - NCBI Taxonomy Database
 Ichneumon sarcitorius - Global Biodiversity Information Facility
 Ichneumon sarcitorius - Encyclopedia of Life

Ichneumoninae
Wasps described in 1758
Taxa named by Carl Linnaeus